Charley's Aunt is a 1915 American film. The film is based on the 1892 play Charley's Aunt by Brandon Thomas.

Plot

Cast 
 Lynne Carver 
 Oliver Hardy

References 

Silent American comedy films
1915 films
American silent feature films
1915 comedy films
American films based on plays
Films based on Charley's Aunt
American black-and-white films
1910s American films